Shenzhen Meilin Middle School is an ordinary high school in the Futian District of Shenzhen City, Guangdong Province, China.

References

External links
 Website
 School Panorama created using Dermandar

Futian District
High schools in Shenzhen
Educational institutions established in 1983
1983 establishments in China